Coolidge Ball, born in Indianola, Mississippi, was the first African American athlete to play any sport at the University of Mississippi (Ole Miss) in Oxford, Mississippi. Ball played forward for the Ole Miss basketball team. Because freshmen were not allowed to play with the varsity team back then, Ball played just three seasons (1972, 1973 and 1974). He enrolled in 1970 and received a basketball scholarship.

College career
Ball signed scholarship papers to New Mexico State before he signed the national letter of intent to Ole Miss. He was recruited by New Mexico State assistants Rob Evans and Ed Murphy, both future Ole Miss head coaches. Ball also was recruited by then-Jackson State University head coach Paul Covington.

As of August 2008, Ball ranked 11th on the Ole Miss scoring charts with 1,072 points and fifth in career rebounds with 754. Ole Miss had a winning season in all three seasons he played.

After college
Since 1979, Ball has owned and operated Ball Sign Company, a business he started upon his return to Oxford after a four-year stint coaching basketball at Northwest Mississippi Community College.

Honors
In 2005, Ball was part of the SEC Basketball Legends 2005 class honored at the SEC Men's Basketball Tournament at the Georgia Dome in Atlanta, Georgia.

In August 2008, Ball was inducted into the Mississippi Sports Hall of Fame.

Ball is also in the Ole Miss Athletic Hall of Fame.

References

3. (Basketball legends game)

Year of birth missing (living people)
Living people
Ole Miss Rebels men's basketball players
People from Indianola, Mississippi
American men's basketball players
Forwards (basketball)